The 2007 FIM Sidecarcross world championship, the 28th edition of the competition, started on 9 April and finished after eight race weekends on 16 September 2007 with Daniël Willemsen taking out the title once more.

Overview
The 2007 season was the 28th edition of the sidecarcross world championship. It resulted in a record sixth world championship for Daniël Willemsen, his fifth in a row, but the first with his new passenger Reto Grütter from Switzerland. The team absolutely dominated the season, winning fifteen out of the sixteen races, of those, the first twelve in a row. Despite this, their winning margin of 89 points was not a new record, this is still held by Kristers Sergis / Artis Rasmanis with 168, set in 2002, however, in a 28 race season. The only race the world champion didn't win, number 13, they team finished outside the points on 24th rank. Second placed Jan Hendrickx / Tim Smeuninx did not win a race all season but nine podium finishes and the fact that the team saw the final flag in all races put them well ahead of place three. Kristers Sergis, five times world champion, came third in the 2007 season, with eight second places and a win to his name, in their home GP. Apart from this performances, his results were not strong enough for a sixth title.

The eight races of the season were held in six countries, France, Belgium, Germany, Croatia, Latvia and the Netherlands.

Format
Every Grand Prix weekend is split into two races, both held on the same day. This means the 2007 season with its eight Grand Prix had sixteen races. Each race is currently 30 minutes plus 2 rounds long. The 2007 season had 60 teams registered but not all of them raced in every event. Teams go through a qualifying, usually on Saturday. Typically, around 50 teams compete for 30 spots on the starting grid, meaning around 20 teams miss out on the race altogether. Some teams did not actually get a race start all season, failing in qualifying each time. All up, 48 of those teams gained competition points. Only three teams qualified but never scored any points. About fifteen teams never achieved to get above the cut.

The first twenty teams of each race scored competition points, allocated accordingly to the following system:

Calendar
The 2007 season had the same number of races as in the previous year, however, only half the races were held in the same locations as in 2006. The countries hosting GP's however had not changed:

 The Sidecarcross des Nations in Slagelse on 23 September 2007 is a non-championship event but part of the calendar and is denoted by a light blue background in the table above.
 Passengers in italics.

Classification

Riders
The top ten of the 2007 season:

 Equipment listed is motor and frame.

Race by race statistics
The numbers for every team are allocated according to their 2006 season finish, meaning the world champion received number one and so on. The numbers for drivers not participating this season were not re-allocated, for example number 16 was not used as Uli Müller who finished 16th in 2006 had retired. New entries received a random number. In the last season, 50 teams finished with points in the overall table, every number above this is therefore a new entry or has not scored points the previous year, the exception being the numbers 68 and 116 who should have been numbers 13 and 21. This system makes it possible to see a driver's improvement or decline from last year by comparing number with position.

The sixteen race events finished as follows and resulted in this final table:

 Where there is only one flag shown, it indicates driver and passenger are from the same country.
 Placings below the first twenty not shown.
 Drivers who never qualified for any GP not shown.
 x denotes qualified for race but finished outside of points.
 Passengers in italics.

Manufacturers
The manufacturers of side car frames are very specialized companies, catering for a small market, but within this they are very well known. Engines can be large half litre off-the-line machines. However, specialized sidecar engines are available to, like the 2-stroke engines from MTH (630cc) and Zabel (685cc). In the 2007 season, four out of the top-five used a VMC frame, including the world champion. Zabel provided the engines to the world champion and the runner-up. The only other engines found in the top ten were KTM and JAWA.

References

External links
 The World Championship on Sidecarcross.com
 The John Davey Grand Prix Pages – Results of all GP's up until 2005
 FIM Sidecar Motocross World Championship 2010

Sidecarcross world chmapionship, 2007
Sidecarcross World Championship seasons